Afdera is an isolated stratovolcano in northeastern Ethiopia, located at the intersection of three fault systems between the Erta Ale, Tat Ali, and Alayta mountain ranges.

There have been reports of the volcano erupting in 1907 and 1915 but morphological evidence cannot substantiate these claims. The reported eruptions were probably from the Mount Alayta volcano to the west.

See also
List of volcanoes in Ethiopia
List of stratovolcanoes

References

Mountains of Ethiopia
Stratovolcanoes of Ethiopia
Afar Region